Harlan F. Stone (1872–1946) was an Attorney General of the United States. Attorney General Stone may also refer to:

George Frederick Stone (1812–1875), Attorney General of Western Australia
Shane Stone (born 1950), Attorney-General of the Northern Territory
William Stone (attorney) (1842–1897), Attorney General of South Carolina